Turan Ensemble (also named Тұран, or Turan Ethno Folk Band) is a Kazakh folk music band, which was created in 2008 by several students of Kazakh National Conservatory named after Kurmangazy.

The Turan ensemble is a band composed of five members: Abzal Arykbaev who is the group's throat singer, Maxat (Maksat) Medeubek, Bauirzhan Bekmukhanbetov, Serik Nurmoldaev, Erzhigit Aliyev.

The band usually play popular folk instruments such as dombra, zhetigen, kobyz, sybyzgy, sherter, shankobyz and some others. In their performances the Turan ensemble often wears traditional Kazakh costume to invoke links to an ancient Turkic past. As artists-in-residence at the Museum of Kazakh Folk Musical Instruments, the Turan ensemble seeks new ways to remodel folk music by using these traditional Kazakh musical instruments.

Experience 
Under the auspices of the Kazakh Ministry of Culture, the Turan ensemble has toured Central Asia, Europe and the United States. The ensemble has participated in a number of international events, and has released recordings of their work:
From 2008 to 2015, Turan ensemble attend a lot of music festivals, and made numerous successful performances all over the world.
In August 2008, Turan became a member of the international festival "Young Euro Classic" in Berlin, and their performance in Germany received a good response
In November 2009, the Turan ensemble made a very successful concert tour of the United States, performing in Los Angeles, San Francisco, Washington DC, Boston and New York.
Spring 2010, the ensemble's first CD Turan was released.
April 2010, Turan conduct a solo concert in Israel.
August 2010, Ensemble became a member of the World Grand kurultay "Turan" in Hungary. The world media reported their performance.
In 2011, Turan ensemble performed in many countries representing Kazakhstan.
Performance In Bundestkunsthalle (Berlin).
Attend the opening of the first Kazakh cinema festival "Kazakhstan: a kaleidoscope of pictures" in Los Angeles, USA.
performance in Hammer Museum, UCLA.
Award winner at ethnic festival "Sharq Taronalari-2011" in Samarkand, Uzbekistan
Solo concert in Barcelona, Spain, in Yekaterinburg, Russia, in Stuttgart, Frankfurt, Munich, Düsseldorf (Germany).
Release the second album "El turan"
October 2013, performed at the 8-day "IIC Experience" festival in New Delhi, India
November 2013, Turan ensemble conduct "Величие кюя" concert-lecture in Museum of Kazakh folk musical instruments.
November 2014, solo concert in an exhibition about Kazakhstan culture, at Place du Palais-Royal, Paris, France, for the opening of direct Paris to Almaty airline (.
December 2014, made a solo concert called "Ер Тұран" for the independence of Kazakhstan.
October 2015, Turan attended the World Music Shanghai in China and performed at several places in Beijing and Shanghai.

Photographs

Classical tracks 
Their classical tracks include:
01-Er Turan【Anshilik-Аңшылық】<Ер Тұран>
02-Er Turan【Elim ai-Елім ай】<Ер Тұран>
03-Er Turan【Er Turan-Ер Тұран】<Ер Тұран>
04-Er Turan【Inspiration-Вдохновение】<Ер Тұран>
05-Er Turan【Jarapazan-Жарапазан】
06-Er Turan【Kara jorga-Кара жорга】<Ер Тұран>
07-Er Turan【Kazajstan-Қазақстан】
08-Er Turan【Kazak land-Казак елi】<Тұран>
09-Er Turan【Koroglu-Короглы】<Ер Тұран>
10-Er Turan【Kossbassar】
11-Er Turan【Lullaby-Колыбельная】<Тұран>
12-Er Turan【Mothers Hand-Ана алақаны】<Тұран>
13-Er Turan【Mukkagali Tolgyi-Мұқағали толғауы】<Ер Тұран>
14-Er Turan【Orteke-Ортеке】<Ер Тұран>
15-Er Turan【Koroglu-Короглы】<Тұран>
16-Er Turan【Secret of feeling-Сезім сыры】<Тұран>
17-Er Turan【Shaman】
18-Er Turan【Swan-Аққу】<Ер Тұран>
19-Er Turan【Tolgau-Толгау】<Тұран>
20-Er Turan【Toy duman-Тоң думан】<Тұран>
21-Er Turan【Zharapazan】
22-Uly Turan  Mangilik 【Uly Turan Mangilik-Ұлы Тұран - Мәңгілік】<Тұран>
23-Uly Turan  Mangilik 【Eagle-Бүркіт】<Тұран>
24-Uly Turan  Mangilik 【Difficult time - Қилы заман】<Тұран>
25-Uly Turan  Mangilik 【Syrlasu - Сырласу】<Тұран>
26-Uly Turan  Mangilik 【Ansa janym - Аңса жаным】<Тұран>
27-Uly Turan  Mangilik 【Lame Kulan - Ақсақ құлан】 <Тұран>
28-Uly Turan  Mangilik 【Caravan - Керуен】 <Тұран>
29-Uly Turan  Mangilik 【Zheldirme - Желдірме】 <Тұран>
30-Uly Turan  Mangilik 【Balbobek -Балбөбек】 <Тұран>
31-Uly Turan  Mangilik 【Kara jorga-Кара жорга】 <Тұран>

References

External links

Kazakhstani musical groups
Folk music groups